The men's 110 metres hurdles event at the 2007 European Athletics U23 Championships was held in Debrecen, Hungary, at Gyulai István Atlétikai Stadion on 13 and 14 July.

Medalists

Results

Final
14 July
Wind: -0.4 m/s

Heats
13 July
First 3 in each heat and 2 best to the Final

Heat 1
Wind: -2.6 m/s

Heat 2
Wind: 0.3 m/s

Participation
According to an unofficial count, 15 athletes from 11 countries participated in the event.

 (1)
 (1)
 (1)
 (3)
 (3)
 (1)
 (1)
 (1)
 (1)
 (1)
 (1)

References

110 metres hurdles
Sprint hurdles at the European Athletics U23 Championships